Misso is a small borough in Rõuge Parish, Võru County, South East Estonia. Between 1991–2017 (until the administrative reform of Estonian municipalities) it was the administrative center of Misso Parish.

It is situated on the European route E77.

References

Boroughs and small boroughs in Estonia
Kreis Werro